The 2010 New Orleans Bowl was the tenth edition of the New Orleans Bowl.  The game was played at the Louisiana Superdome in New Orleans, Louisiana, on Saturday, December 18, 2010, at 9 p.m. Eastern Time. The contest was televised live on ESPN.  The game featured the Ohio Bobcats of the Mid-American Conference versus the Troy Trojans from the Sun Belt Conference. Sponsored by R+L Carriers, the game was officially known as the R+L Carriers New Orleans Bowl.

Teams

Ohio Bobcats

The Bobcats entered the New Orleans Bowl with a record of 8–4.  The team was 1 win away from playing in the MAC Championship game before losing their final game of the season to Kent State.  Ohio made its first appearance in the New Orleans Bowl.  The Bobcats appeared in their 3rd bowl game under head coach Frank Solich, however they were 0–2 in the two prior games, and Ohio had never won a bowl game in school history in four attempts.  They were a 21–17 loser to Marshall in the 2009 Little Caesars Pizza Bowl.

Troy Trojans

Troy entered the bowl game with a 7–5 overall record and won a share of the Sun Belt Conference Championship.  The Trojans played in their third straight bowl game.  This will also mark the third time in five seasons that Troy will be playing in the New Orleans Bowl.  They are currently 1–1 in New Orleans Bowl games with a win over Rice in 2006 and a loss to Southern Miss in 2008.  Last season Troy was defeated by Central Michigan by a score of 44–41 in the GMAC Bowl.

Scoring summary

Source

Statistics

Notes
The 2010 New Orleans Bowl marked the first time that the 2 schools played each other in the history of their programs.

References

New Orleans Bowl
New Orleans Bowl
Ohio Bobcats football bowl games
Troy Trojans football bowl games
2010 in sports in Louisiana